Peter McDonald (born 28 January 1972) is an Irish Oscar nominated stage and screen actor and director. He was nominated for an Academy Award for Best Live Action Short Film for his short film Pentecost.

Early life and education
He grew up in Mount Merrion, County Dublin.  He was educated at St. Michael's College, Dublin and graduated from University College Dublin with a Bachelor of Arts, English and a Master of Fine Arts, English in 1994. He got his start in theatre as part of UCD's Drama Society and was a member of the Fly by Night Theatre Company.

Career

McDonald has appeared in films including Felicia's Journey (written and directed by Atom Egoyan, 1999) and When Brendan Met Trudy (written by Roddy Doyle and directed by Kieron J. Walsh, 2000); television series (the BBC's Sea of Souls and Channel 4's Green Wing); and theatre productions both in Dublin and London, including The Lieutenant of Inishmore and Days of Wine and Roses.  

He co-starred with Jonathan Pryce and Aidan Gillen in Glengarry Glen Ross at the Apollo Theatre in 2007. He features prominently in RTÉ's comedy show Your Bad Self. He made his debut in 1997 as the character Git Hynes in the Irish comedy I Went Down, co-starring with Brendan Gleeson. 

He wrote and directed Pentecost, a live action short film which was nominated for the 2012 Academy Award for Best Live Action Short Film. He co-wrote and acted in the full-length movie, The Stag, which was nominated for six Irish Film and Television Academy (IFTA) awards in 2014.

Theatre

Filmography

Television

Awards and nominations

References

External links
 
 

1972 births
Irish male film actors
Irish male stage actors
Irish male television actors
Living people
Male actors from County Dublin
People educated at St Michael's College, Dublin